Vienne-en-Val is a commune in the Loiret department in north-central France.

See also
Communes of the Loiret department

References

Vienneenval
Carnutes